Changxing railway station is a high-speed railway station located in northeast Changxing County, Huzhou, Zhejiang, China, serving the Nanjing–Hangzhou high-speed railway. It is served by high-speed trains whereas Changxing South is served by conventional trains.

History
Construction on the station began in August 2010. With the construction of the Nanjing–Hangzhou high-speed railway, the original Changxing railway station was renamed Changxing South in 2012. The station opened on 1 July 2013.

References

External links
 

Railway stations in Zhejiang